Armilimax (meaning 'armoured slug') is an extinct genus of shell-bearing slug-like animal known from a single specimen found in an exposed portion of the Spence Shale in the Wellsville Mountains in Box Elder County, Utah.  As such, its morphology is ambiguous; it bears a seemingly U-shaped gut and, at the opposite end of its body, a shell without an apex.  It has been tentatively interpreted as resembling Halkieria, but it does not contain sclerites. It is the first of its kind in the Great Basin. Only one species is known: Armilimax pauljamisoni.

References

Fossil taxa described in 2020
Fossils of the United States
Paleontology in Utah
Prehistoric animal enigmatic taxa
Monotypic prehistoric animal genera